Ecstasy and Wine is a compilation album by the Irish-English alternative rock band My Bloody Valentine, released in February 1989 on Lazy Records. It features the band's second mini album, Ecstasy, and the single "Strawberry Wine", both of which were previously released on Lazy Records in November 1987.

Release and reception
An alternate mix of "Strawberry Wine" was used on the album due to an error by personnel at Lazy Records. Released without the band's consent, at the time of Ecstasy and Wines release My Bloody Valentine were signed to Creation Records on which the band had released their debut studio album, Isn't Anything (1988).

Upon its release, Ecstasy and Wine peaked at number 2 on the United Kingdom Independent Albums Chart. David Stubbs, offering a mixed review in Melody Maker, referred to the album as "a more quiet and mannered affair than Isn't Anything" and described its material as "a muffled, pastoral drone … overshadowed by a distant whirlwind of feedback". Writing for AllMusic in a positive retrospective review, Bradley Torreano described the compilation as "the sound of a band discovering its unique voice" with vocalists and guitarists Kevin Shields and Bilinda Butcher "exploring the guitar landscapes that would later become their trademark"; Torreano rated the album four out of five stars.

Legacy
Shields, irate about Lazy Records releasing the album without the band's consent, retrieved 10,000 LP copies from the label's manager soon after its release. He sold the records to various distributors in the early 1990s, after My Bloody Valentine were dropped from Creation Records, and used the funds to finance later recording sessions.

In February 2012 Graham Coxon, lead guitarist of Blur, included the album in NMEs list of the "100 Great Albums You've Never Heard", placing it at number 12.

Track listing

Personnel
All personnel credits adapted from Ecstasy and Wines liner notes.

My Bloody Valentine
Kevin Shields – vocals, guitar
Bilinda Butcher – vocals, guitar
Debbie Googe – bass
Colm Ó Cíosóig – drums

Guest musicians
Nick Brown – violin 

Technical personnel
My Bloody Valentine – production
Steve Nunn – engineering

Chart positions

References

Bibliography

External links

1989 compilation albums
My Bloody Valentine (band) compilation albums